Aicelle Anne Coronel Santos-Zambrano (born February 24, 1985), is a Filipino singer-songwriter, pianist, and actress who. She has been known as the "First Undefeated Pinoy Pop Superstar", when she achieved eight straight wins in GMA Network's Pinoy Pop Superstar, She is an International Stage Diva who played Gigi in Miss Saigon, " Eat Bulaga's Traffic Diva", and known as the one and only  "Soul Flair Songstress".

Biography

Early life and career
At the age of six, Aicelle Santos or "AA" received abecedarian musical training at the St. Theresa's College Quezon City, and the University of the Philippines College of Music for piano. The early training allowed Aicelle to indulge in her original dream to become a famous pianist. However, a shift in focus took place as she realized she would rather be a famous singer than be a known pianist. Aicelle's inspiration on the field came from Walt Disney's character Ariel from the movie The Little Mermaid. The movie's theme song "Part of Your World" was the first song Aicelle memorized, which she also performed during her elementary school programs.

While still at her first year of college at the Pamantasan ng Lungsod ng Maynila, Aicelle joined ABS-CBN's Season 1 of Star in a Million (2003), her first take on a nationwide televised singing competition. The competition opened many doors for Aicelle. Although she sometimes struggled, she eventually struck a balance between attending university and focusing on her blossoming singing career.

Aicelle took advantage of the minor fame that her Star in a Million appearance gave her and showcased her talents on top performers' settings with a new acoustic group Dream Sequence. Dream Sequence proved to be a success on its own right, and brought its three members to many cities around the Philippines. The Metro's prime stages Bagaberde, Chef and Brewer, Phi Bar, Fiesta San Miguel in Dusit, E's Bar in Edsa Shangri-La, and others became the group's main performing stages. The nightly gigs are believed to have been Aicelle's training ground for improving her vocal and stage performance.

On January 4, 2016 Aicelle Santos interpreted Dinggin Mo Oh Dios which was composed by Cris Bautista in A Song of Praise Music Festival year 4, a gospel songwriting competition, in UNTV with Reymond Sajor, Leah Patricio, Rachelle Ann Go, Frencheska Farr, Jonalyn Viray, Rita De Guzman, RJ Buena & Kyla. On February 14, 2016 Aicelle will be contestant in Sunday Central Club Battle of the Champions with Reymond Sajor Lizbeth Yap Dy & Julie Anne San Jose.

In 2018, Santos bid farewell to fans as she will be leaving for United Kingdom to star as Gigi Van Tranh in the hit musical Miss Saigon.

Audition

Pinoy Pop Superstar
In 2005, Aicelle once again decided to aim for a solo singing career by joining the second season of Pinoy Pop Superstar. An eight-straight win during preliminaries put Aicelle on top and on the show's history, as the first 'Undefeated Superstar.' She showcased her impressively wide vocal range on her performances of:
All The Man That I Need – Week 1,
I Need You – Week 2,
Natural Woman – Week 3,
A House Is Not A Home – Week 4,
Respect – Week 5,
Summertime – Week 6,
A Song For You – Week 7,
Man In The Mirror – Week 8.

Aicelle got into the finals favored to win. On PPS's season finale, Aicelle Santos claimed first runner-up and signed a record deal and an exclusive management contract under GMA Artist Center. Her story in Pinoy Pop Superstar is somehow related to Sheryn Regis.

Music career
Once again, Aicelle proved her vocal competence when she won "Best Performance of Own Country Song" representing the Philippines in Astana Music Festival in Kazakhstan. Aicelle bested delegates from 13 countries around the world, including Mexico, Peru, Finland, Romania, Latvia, Bulgaria, Czech Republic, Tajikistan, Lithuania, Sri Lanka, Indonesia, Malta, and China. Her winning piece was entitled "Bakit Di Subukan", a Vehnee Saturno composition which is a Tagalog-English song ("If We Just Hold On" in English). Following this triumph was Aicelle's recognition for "People's Choice Best New Female Artist" in the 2007 Awit Awards.

In 2007, Aicelle is visible in the Philippines recording scene with her debut album Make Me Believe, a 14-cut album under GMA Records. Ikaw Pa Rin is her hit single in the charts.

In 2008, she joined fellow Pinoy Pop Superstar contestants Jona and Maricris Garcia to form the musical group La Diva.

On February 25, 2015, Aicelle held her first solo concert, Class A, at the PETA Theatre. On the same year, she released the music video of her latest single Kapangyarihan ng Pag-ibig.

Theatrical Works
In 2012, Aicelle auditioned and was part of the shortlist for the 2014 West End revival of Miss Saigon.

In 2013, she debuted in the theatrical scene by portraying the role of Katy in Katy! the Musical. She also stars in Rak of Aegis where she plays the lead character, Aileen (alternating with Kim Molina). The musical had several runs but Aicelle continues to play the role till present. Aicelle won Best Actress in a Musical in the 2014 Aliw Awards for her performance in Rak of Aegis.

In 2015, Aicelle had a special participation in the musical entitled Sabel: Love and Passion.

In 2017, she played Perla in the musical adaptation of Maynila sa mga Kuko ng Liwanag and won the 2017 Aliw Award for Best Actress in a Featured Role.

In 2018, Aicelle played Elsa in the second revival of Himala: Isang Musikal, based on the 1982 film starring Nora Aunor. She is set to play the role of Gigi in the UK/Ireland tour of Miss Saigon.

Vocal profile
Santos possesses the vocal range of a lyric mezzo soprano, spanning three full octaves (from the lowest note of Bb2 to the highest note of Bb5).

Personal life
Santos and her boyfriend of three years, former broadcast journalist Mark Zambrano, tied the knot on November 16, 2019 in San Juan, Batangas. In June 2020, Santos announced on an Instagram post that she and Zambrano were expecting their first child, due in December.

Discography

Studio albums
Make Me Believe (2007)
Liwanag (2015)

Singles
"Ikaw Pa Rin" (2007)
"Make Me Believe" (2007)
"Kapangyarihan Ng Pag-Ibig" (2015)
"Liwanag" (2016)
"Palaging Ikaw" (2017)

Soundtracks
"Tayong Dalawa" (2006) (from Bakekang)
"Maghihintay" (2007) (from Impostora)
"I'll Never Go" (with Gian Magdangal) (2013) (from My Lady Boss)
"Paliparin ang Pangarap" (with Maricris Garcia) (2013) (from  Adarna)
"Liyab" (2014) (from Niño)
"Be With You" (2015) (from The Rich Man's Daughter)
"Nasaan" (with Maricris Garcia) (2015) (from  Beautiful Strangers)
"Hanggang Makita Kang Muli" (2016) (from the  theme song of same teleserye)
"Sa Lahat ng Iba" (with Hannah Precillas) (2016) (from Ika-6 na Utos)
"Kumapit Ka Lang" (2017) (from Tadhana)
"Haplos" (2017) (from Haplos)
"Nasa Iyong Tabi" (2017) (from Super Ma'am)
"Bahagi Ko ng Langit (2018) (from The Stepdaughters)
"Panata sa Bayan" (2019) (from Eleksyon 2019 and Eleksyon 2022 Coverages of GMA News)
"Bakit Siya?" (with Maricris Garcia) (2019) (from  The Better Woman)

Compilation albums
The Pinoy Pop Superstar Year 2 Contenders' Album (2006)
 Track 3: All The Man That I Need
Mga Awit Mula Sa Puso, Vol. 2 (2006)
Track 3: "Tayong Dalawa"
Mga Awit Kapuso, Vol. 4 (2008)
Track 3: "Marimar"
The Best of Mga Awit Kapuso (2009)
Track 10: "Tayong Dalawa"
GMA Records No.1 Hits (2013)
Track: "Ikaw Pa Rin" (with Janno Gibbs)
Take1: the Best of Awit Kapuso Originals (2013)
Track 9: "Marimar"
Versions 7.1 (2014)
Track 2: "All the Man That I Need"

Theatre

Filmography

Television
As Herself

As Actress

Awards and Recognitions

Contemporaries
Jona
Carla Humphries
Maricris Garcia
Bryan Termulo
Jan Nieto
Gian Magdangal

References

External links
 Aicelle Santos Online
 Aicelle Multimedia at YouTube

Sparkle GMA Artist Center profile

1985 births
Living people
Filipino women pop singers
Singers from Metro Manila
Participants in Philippine reality television series
Filipino dance musicians
Pamantasan ng Lungsod ng Maynila alumni
Contraltos
Filipino television actresses
Filipino musical theatre actresses
GMA Network personalities
GMA Music artists
Filipino television personalities
Filipino women television presenters
Filipino television variety show hosts